S Trianguli Australis is a yellow-white hued variable star in the constellation Triangulum Australe. It is a dim star near the lower limit of visibility with the naked eye, having a typical apparent visual magnitude of 6.41.

A Classical Cepheid variable, its apparent magnitude ranges from 5.95 to 6.81 over 6.32344 days. It is a bright giant with a nominal stellar classification of F8 II, that pulsates between spectral types F6II-G2. The star has 2.8 times the mass of the Sun and 39.2 times the Sun's radius.

References

F-type bright giants
Classical Cepheid variables
Triangulum Australe
Durchmusterung objects
078476
142941
5939
Trianguli Australis, S